Yulin railway station is a railway station located in Yuzhou District, Yulin, Guangxi, China

History
The station opened on 1 January 1956, shortly after the completion of the Litang–Zhanjiang railway. In 1996 the station was upgraded from second to first class. On 30 September 2016 the new station building was opened.

References 

Railway stations in Guangxi
Railway stations in China opened in 1956